Sweet Springs is an unincorporated community in Monroe County in the U.S. state of West Virginia. Sweet Springs lies at the intersection of West Virginia Route 3 and West Virginia Route 311.

The community is known for its Sweet Springs Resort and spa, listed on the National Register of Historic Places. Its developer, William Lewis, attempted unsuccessfully to create a town named Fontville at the location in 1790. There was a Sweet Springs Post Office in the community from 1795 until 1997.

References

External links 
Old Sweet Springs VT Underground
Sweet Springs Resort at Abandoned
Sweet Springs at Traveling 219 project
Sweet Springs Resort National Register of Historic Places Listing
 "Taking the Waters: 19th Century Mineral Springs: Sweet Springs." Claude Moore Health Sciences Library, University of Virginia

Unincorporated communities in Monroe County, West Virginia
Spa towns in West Virginia
Unincorporated communities in West Virginia
Historic American Buildings Survey in West Virginia